(born 1977 in Tokyo, Japan), professionally known as , is a Japanese drum and bass musician, DJ and actor.  Among other distinctive elements of Makoto's musical style, a heavy influence of 1970s-era soul, funk and jazz fusion can be heard throughout the vast majority of his repertoire.

Career
Inspired by LTJ Bukem's Logical Progression album and Goldie's Timeless, he began to experiment with his own drum and bass music compositions.  His unique style received the attention of LTJ Bukem and his Good Looking Records label, and Makoto was later featured on several of LTJ Bukem's mix CDs.

Makoto's first studio album, Human Elements, was released on Good Looking Records in 2003. His second studio album, Believe In My Soul, was  released on the same label in 2007.  He had also recorded a live album with frequent touring partner MC Deeizm for the label's Progression Sessions series of live mixes.

Makoto's album Souled Out was released in Japan on 5 October 2011 and worldwide on 10 October 2011 by Makoto's physical label Human Elements and on his digital download-only label HE:Digital.

Makoto continues to act and tour in support of his music, mostly in Japan, but also across Asia, Europe, and USA.

His music is also featured in Polyphony's Gran Turismo series and its spinoff, Tourist Trophy.

In 2021, he was featured on the soundtrack of Forza Horizon 5 with the songs Trial Mountain and Another Star.

Discography

Albums

Studio albums
 2003: Human Elements
 2007: Believe In My Soul
 2011: Souled Out
 2015: Aquarian Dreams
 2017: Salvation
 2019: Tomodachi Sessions
 2022: Motion Of Change

Selected compilation albums
 2000: LTJ Bukem Featuring MC Conrad & DRS / Makoto Progression Sessions 5
 2011: Something We Can Do

Selected singles and EPs
 1998: Down Angel / EchoVox (Positive Machine Soul Mix)
 1998: Wave / Jupiters Field (12")
 1999: Enterprise / Sweet Changes
 1999: Far East / Butterfly
 2000: Situations EP
 2000: Situations EP
 2001: Takkyu Ishino Feat. Tabito Nanao* / Makoto Feat. Lori Fine ラストシーン / You're Divine (Edit) (12")
 2001: Cascade (4) / JLaze / Makoto Mysteries / Trapezoid / Blackberry Jam / Voices (2x12")
 2001: You're Divine (12")
 2001: Blackberry Jam / Voices (12")
 2002: Musical Message EP
 2003: My Soul
 2003: Time 2003
 2004: Laroque / Makoto Sublime Intervention / What To Do (12", Single, Promo)
 2004: Joy EP Plate 1
 2005: MC Conrad & Makoto Golden Girl
 2007: Sonic & Makoto Tearing Soul / Lovesong
 2007: Greg Packer & Makoto Pleasure / Science Fiction
 2007: Makoto & Specialist (4) Pachinko / A Different Story
 2007: Hurinkazan (12")
 2007: Eastern Dub Pt.2 (12")
 2008: Zinc* & Makoto / Makoto & Deeizm Fade Away / Monotonik
 2009: Makato* / Greg Packer & Muller  Music In Me (Greg Packer Remix) / Kat Magnit
 2009: Nik Weston Presents Makoto & Kez Ym Featuring Takumi Kaneko From Cro Magnon*  Chameleon (12", Ltd, 180)
 2009: A Sides* & Makoto Spacetrain / The Final Fugutive (12")
 2009: Sentimental Moods / And I Love Her (12")
 2011: Tower Of Love / Keep Me Down (12")
 2011: DJ Marky & Makoto / Makoto Aquarius / Good Old Days (12")
 2016: YGMYC
 2016: Danny Wheeler & Makoto Sunshine / Midnight Hour
 2020: Artificial Intelligence & Makoto Cold Expanse
 2021: Spread Love (feat. Pete Simpson) / Contact
 2021: What You Need

References

External links
  – official site
 

Drum and bass musicians
Japanese electronic musicians
Living people
1977 births